The Midwestern Intercollegiate Volleyball Association (MIVA) is a college athletic conference whose member schools compete in men's volleyball.  The conference footprint is centered in the Midwestern United States, stretching from Missouri in the west to Ohio in the east; a North Carolina school will join in 2023. Many of the conference's schools also participate in the similarly named Midwest Intercollegiate Volleyball Association in men's volleyball at the club level.

The MIVA Tournament champion receives an automatic bid to the NCAA National Collegiate Men's Volleyball Championship, which now consists of seven teams playing in a single-elimination format to determine the national champion. The two other pre-2017 major volleyball conferences, the EIVA (Eastern Intercollegiate Volleyball Association) and the MPSF (Mountain Pacific Sports Federation), also send their league tournament champions to the tournament, as do Conference Carolinas (since the 2014 season) and the Big West Conference (from the 2018 season forward).

History

On February 4, 1961 the Midwest Intercollegiate Volleyball Conference, the nation's first men's college volleyball league, was started in Lansing, Michigan by representatives of Ball State University, Detroit Institute of Technology, Earlham College, George Williams College, Lansing College, Michigan State University, Ohio State University, and Wittenberg College. The league came about largely through the efforts of Jim Coleman of Wittenberg College and Don Shondell of Ball State University. The league name was later changed to the Midwest Intercollegiate Volleyball Association (MIVA). Over the years, more than forty schools from Divisions I, II, and III, as well as a couple of junior colleges, have participated as members of the MIVA. The current membership is made up of five D-I (including two charter members) and three D-II institutions, with Lindenwood University having started a transition from D-II to D-I in July 2022. Another transitional D-I school, Queens University of Charlotte, will join the MIVA in July 2023.

Three MIVA teams have won the NCAA National Collegiate Men's Volleyball Championship, although only two are officially recognized by the NCAA. Lewis' 2003 title was later vacated by the school due to player eligibility issues, and the NCAA no longer recognizes the title. Loyola won the national championship in both 2014 and 2015, and Ohio State won the title in 2011, 2016, and 2017.

Membership timeline

Members
The MIVA comprises eight teams from the NCAA's Division I and Division II. A ninth team will join in 2023 (2024 season).

Current members

Future member

The most recent change in MIVA membership was in 2017, when Grand Canyon left the MIVA for the Mountain Pacific Sports Federation. The next change in membership will come in 2023 with the arrival of Queens.

One current MIVA member changed its institutional and athletic identity after the 2018 men's volleyball season. Indiana University – Purdue University Fort Wayne (IPFW), a joint venture between the Indiana University and Purdue University systems, was dissolved at the end of the 2017–18 school year. IPFW's academic programs in health sciences now operate as Indiana University Fort Wayne, and all other academic programs transferred to Purdue as Purdue University Fort Wayne (PFW). The athletic program was inherited solely by PFW. Shortly before the split took effect,  PFW announced that the athletic program, previously known as the Fort Wayne Mastodons, would become the Purdue Fort Wayne Mastodons.

Former members 
Affiliations reflect those for men's volleyball, and are current for the ongoing 2023 NCAA men's volleyball season (2022–23 school year). Institutional names and nicknames reflect those in current use, not necessarily those used while each school was an MIVA member.

The NCAA's top men's volleyball championship is open to schools in Divisions I and II, with scholarship limits identical for members of each division. Therefore, this table makes no distinction between NCAA Division I and Division II conferences.

MIVA Champions

Titles

MIVA in the NCAA tournament
Until 2014, the NCAA National Collegiate Men's Volleyball Championship was a Final Four only tournament with the champions of three conferences (EIVA, MIVA, and MPSF) receiving automatic bids and one team getting an at-large bid. In 2014, the tournament expanded to include the champion of the Division II Conference Carolinas and a second at-large team. The tournament expanded to seven teams for 2018 with the addition of the Big West Conference champion.

References

External links